Rafat is a surname. Notable people with the surname include:

Taufiq Rafat, Pakistani poet
Payan Rafat, Iranian footballer and coach
Darius Rafat, Canadian music producer, composer, bandleader, music agent, and entrepreneur
Taqi Rafat, Iranian poet, playwright, critic, and journalist

See also
Rifat